Sulby Bridge Railway Station (Manx: Stashoon Raad Yiarn Droghad Sulby) was a station on the Manx Northern Railway (MNR), later owned and operated by the Isle of Man Railway; it served the village of Sulby in the Isle of Man and was an intermediate stopping place on a line that ran between St. John's and Ramsey.

Description and history

The station was provided with a sandstone building, in the same style as those at Kirk Michael and Ballaugh, and is still extant as a private residence. The station served the village of Sulby, as did nearby Sulby Glen railway station, but also had a long passing loop and, until the early 1960s, a goods siding.

Later years
The line through the station remained open for a service of oil tanks until , when the line was finally closed.

The rails were lifted in 1974 and the trackbed is now a public right of way. Nothing remains of the station site today and the area has been redeveloped.

Route

See also

 Isle of Man Railway stations
 Manx Northern Railway
 Sulby

References

Sources 
 [Isle of Man Steam Railway Supporters' Association]

Railway stations in the Isle of Man
Railway stations opened in 1879
Railway stations closed in 1968